Bill Crawford is a comedian and radio personality, best known for his work on The DVE Morning Show on WDVE in Pittsburgh, Pennsylvania since January 2012.  Crawford began doing standup in his native Pittsburgh in the early 2000s. In 2004, he was "discovered" by then-DVE Morning Show host Jim Krenn, who invited him to become a regular guest on the show. As a result, he became a bigger name in Pittsburgh and began touring with big-name comedians. In January 2012, he joined the DVE Morning Show as a full-time member along with former host Scott Paulsen in light of Krenn's dispute with WDVE parent Clear Channel Communications and his dismissal from the show and station. Crawford and Paulsen joined Morning Show stalwarts Randy Baumann, Val Porter and Mike Prisuta.

See also 
 Scott Paulsen
 Jim Krenn
 Randy Baumann

References

External links 
 Bill Crawford's official website
 Bill Crawford's DVE blog

1979 births
American male comedians
Living people
Radio personalities from Pittsburgh
Comedians from Pennsylvania
21st-century American comedians